Suzanne Tallard (born 19 June 1943) is a French politician who was Member of Parliament for Charente-Maritime's 2nd constituency between 2012 and 2017.

She was Mayor of Aytré from 2008 to 2012.

References 

1943 births
Living people
Deputies of the 14th National Assembly of the French Fifth Republic
People from La Rochelle
Women members of the National Assembly (France)
21st-century French politicians
21st-century French women politicians
Socialist Party (France) politicians
Members of Parliament for Charente-Maritime
Women mayors of places in France